Shri Lal Bahadur Shastri Government Medical College & Hospital Mandi is a medical college located in Ner Chowk, Mandi, Himachal Pradesh, India.

History
The Medical College was founded as Employee's State Insurance Corporation Medical College by Shri Oskar Fernandes the then Hon’ble Minister of Labour & Employment, GOI in the year 2009. In the year 2012, Prof Dr D.S. Dhiman was appointed first Dean of the college by the Employee's State Insurance Corporation (ESIC).

In the year 2016, the management of the ESIC showed its reluctance to run this college at its own and ultimately the project was handed over to the Govt. of Himachal Pradesh after signing a MOU under certain conditions. The Govt. of Himachal Pradesh has applied to the MCI to accord permission for starting the batch from 2017-18 for this medical college now named as Shri Lal Bahadur Shastri Govt. Medical College, Mandi at Ner Chowk and the following administrative officers have been appointed :
1.   Dr. D.S. Dhiman as Principal cum Dean.2.   Desh Raj Sharma CMO Mandi as a Medical Superintendent of associate hospital Zonal Hospital Mandi.3.   Pankaj Sharma (HAS), Joint Director.4.   Sh. Mahesh kumar Sharma, Assistant controller (F & A).

Location
Shri Lal Bahadur Shastri Govt. Medical College Mandi at Nerchowk Located in Nerchowk Town on NH-21 (Chandigarh-Manali Road) Distt. Mandi Himachal Pradesh.

Infrastructure 
 Area of Medical College: 32 Acres
 Area of Hospital: 45 Bighas
 Lecture Theatres, Demo rooms, Central Library, Exam Halls
 Auditorium with capacity of 800
 Boys, Girls, Nursing and residents Hostels
  Indoor Facilities:Gymnasium, Badminton Hall, Table Tennis. 
 Outdoor Facilities: Football ground, Hockey, Basketball court.

See also
Atal Bihari Vajpayee University of Medicine and Health Sciences

References

Medical colleges in Himachal Pradesh
Education in Mandi district
Medical colleges in India
Hospitals in Himachal Pradesh
Educational institutions established in 2009
2009 establishments in Himachal Pradesh